Jacqueline Daix (1914–1982) was a French film actress.

Selected filmography
 The Man with a Broken Ear (1934)
 A Day Will Come (1934)
 Merchant of Love (1935)
 The Drunkard (1937)

References

Bibliography
 Goble, Alan. The Complete Index to Literary Sources in Film. Walter de Gruyter, 1999.

External links

1914 births
1982 deaths
French stage actresses
French film actresses
20th-century French women